Hill Township may refer to:

Arkansas
 Hill Township, Independence County, Arkansas, in Independence County, Arkansas
 Hill Township, Pulaski County, Arkansas, in Pulaski County, Arkansas

Michigan
 Hill Township, Michigan

Minnesota
 Hill Township, Kittson County, Minnesota

Missouri
 Hill Township, Carroll County, Missouri

Nebraska
 Hill Township, Knox County, Nebraska

North Dakota
 Hill Township, Cass County, North Dakota, in Cass County, North Dakota

Township name disambiguation pages